The fifth season of Malcolm in the Middle premiered on November 2, 2003, on Fox, and ended on May 23, 2004, with a total of 22 episodes. Frankie Muniz stars as the title character Malcolm, and he is joined by Jane Kaczmarek, Bryan Cranston, Christopher Kennedy Masterson, Justin Berfield and Erik Per Sullivan.

Episodes

Cast and characters

Main 
 Frankie Muniz as Malcolm
 Jane Kaczmarek as Lois
 Bryan Cranston as Hal
 Christopher Kennedy Masterson as Francis
 Justin Berfield as Reese
 Erik Per Sullivan as Dewey

Recurring 
 Craig Lamar Traylor as Stevie Kenarban
 David Anthony Higgins as Craig Feldspar
 Julie Hagerty as Polly
 Kenneth Mars as Otto
 Emy Coligado as Piama
 Katherine Ellis as Gretchen

Production 
In April 2003, Fox renewed Malcolm in the Middle for a fifth season. Main cast members Frankie Muniz, Jane Kaczmarek, Bryan Cranston, Christopher Kennedy Masterson, Justin Berfield and Erik Per Sullivan return as Malcolm, Lois, Hal, Francis, Reese and Dewey respectively. The season reveals that Hal and Lois's fifth child Jamie is a boy. Though it was initially reported that the episode "Lois' Sister" would serve as the series' 100th episode, that honor instead went to the episode "Reese's Apartment".

Release

Broadcast history 
The season premiered on November 2, 2003 on Fox, and ended on May 23, 2004 with a total of 22 episodes.

Home media 
The season was released on Region 2 DVD on April 29, 2013, and on Region 4 DVD on September 4, 2013.

Reception 
Josh Wolk wrote for Entertainment Weekly, "The inevitable reality of aging child stars is unfortunate, as Malcolm still amazes with vibrant comic creativity." Scott D. Pierce wrote for Deseret News, "It's not exactly the same show, and viewers may have gotten used to it, but there's still magic there. It can still make you laugh." People was critical of "Reese's Apartment", saying, "No one's saying this boisterous sitcom has to slow down with age. But Malcolm's 100th episode hurts itself by hopping from story line to story line instead of sticking with the strong central situation." The episode "Dewey's Special Class" won the Primetime Emmy Award for Outstanding Choreography.

In 2019, Angelo Delos Trinos of Screen Rant included the episode "Malcolm Films Reese" in his list, "10 Episodes Of Malcolm in the Middle That Aged Poorly". He wrote, "The way privacy is belittled by the characters involved simply won't fly well today, especially in a school setting." He added, "The subplot about Francis dealing with a critic also aged terribly. Here, the newspaper critic is depicted as a vindictive bully who uses his profession to rain bile on everybody. The problem he presents is solved when he's repeatedly beaten senseless."

References 

2003 American television seasons
2004 American television seasons
Malcolm in the Middle